Sir Charles Blake Cochran (25 September 1872 31 January 1951), generally known as C. B. Cochran, was an English theatrical manager and impresario.  He produced some of the most successful musical revues, musicals and plays of the 1920s and 1930s, becoming associated with Noël Coward and his works.

After beginning his career as an actor in America about 1890, Cochran became a manager and press agent for vaudeville, legitimate theatre and other entertainments.  He returned to England by 1902 producing theatre, variety shows and revues.  By the end of the First World War, he was producing shows at the Oxford Music Hall, including the surprise hit The Better 'Ole.  In addition to producing several Noël Coward works, Cochran introduced or promoted such stars as Coward, Beatrice Lillie, Gertrude Lawrence, Jessie Matthews, Yvonne Printemps, Lizbeth Webb and Effie Atherton.  He also produced the Ballets Russes and, for 12 years, managed the Royal Albert Hall.

Early life
Cochran was born in Sussex and educated at Brighton, Hove and Sussex Grammar School. At the age of 18, he went to New York City and appeared in an adaptation of Around the World in Eighty Days and then toured in an adaptation of Rip Van Winkle. For three years he was personal representative of Richard Mansfield, who saw that Cochran's talent lay in management rather than acting. Subsequently, he was a vaudeville producer and a press representative and operated, and was a press agent for, flea circuses, a medicine show, boxing matches, a rodeo, and other entertainments in the US and later in the UK. He sold fountain pens at the Chicago World's Fair in 1893. He began producing serious theatre in 1897, with Ibsen's John Gabriel Borkman, in New York. Cochran was in London by 1902, producing theatre. From 1904, he promoted wrestling shows featuring George Hackenschmidt, as well as shows featuring Harry Houdini and Odette Dulac, in England.

In 1911, Cochran had a success with the play The Miracle. Another notable show was Houp La! in 1916. The following year, he became responsible for the productions of the Oxford Music Hall, including the surprise hit The Better 'Ole (1917), which ran for over 800 performances.  He later showed an interest in many of the best known English theatres either as lessee or licensee. Cochran was also responsible for bringing Nikita Balieff and Balieff's theatre group "Chauve-Souris" to London.

Later years
From the 1920s, after a major financial setback, he produced musical revues and spectaculars in competition with André Charlot, and collaborated regularly with Noël Coward to produce several of Coward's most famous plays and musical comedies. In 1926 Florence Mills led an African-American cast in the revue Blackbirds at the London Pavilion.  In 1927, Cochran signed tennis star Suzanne Lenglen, together with players Dora Köring, Evelyn Dewhurst, Karel Koželuh and Howard Kinsey for a seven-stop professional head-to-head tour of the United Kingdom.

In the early 1930s he mounted the original London productions of several Cole Porter and Jerome Kern musicals using Hyam Greenbaum as his musical director. Cochran was responsible for discovering new talents and making stars out of them, including Beatrice Lillie, Elisabeth Bergner, Eleanora Duse, Anna Neagle, Florence Desmond, Gertrude Lawrence, Coward, Evelyn Laye, Jessie Matthews, Effie Atherton, Yvonne Printemps, The Dolly Sisters and Lizbeth Webb, who starred in Cochran's long-running Bless the Bride (1948).  He also produced the Ballets Russes and managed the Royal Albert Hall for 12 years.  He was knighted in 1948.

He died on 31 January 1951, aged 78, after being trapped in a bath full of scalding water at his home in London.

Productions 

The Miracle (1911)
Houp La! (1916)
 The Better 'Ole (1917)
 In the Night Watch (1918)
 As You Were (1918)
 The Man Who Came Back (1920)
 League of Notions (1921)
 Fun of the Fayre (1921)
 The Man in Evening Clothes (1924)
 One Damn Thing After Another (1927)
 This Year of Grace (1928)
 The Middle Watch (1929)
 Many Waters (1929)
 Bitter Sweet (1929)
 Wake Up and Dream (1929)
 Private Lives (1930)
 Cavalcade (1931)
 Words and Music (1932)
 Nymph Errant (1933)
 Conversation Piece (1934)
 Anything Goes (1935)
 Escape Me Never (1935)
 Paganini (1937)
 Big Ben  (1946)
 Bless the Bride (1947)
 The Ivory Tower (1948)

Publications 

  Secrets of a Showman (1925)
 C.B.C.'s Review of Revues and Other Matters (1930)
 I Had Almost Forgotten (1932)
 Cock-a-Doodle-Do (1941)
 A Showman Looks On (1945)

Notes

References

External links 
 
 "How Wireless Helps the Theatre", by Cochran, in The Radio Times, 30 November 1923

1872 births
1951 deaths
English male stage actors
Knights Bachelor
People educated at Brighton, Hove and Sussex Grammar School
People from Sussex
English expatriates in the United States
English theatre managers and producers
Professional tennis promoters